

Season summary
1860 Munich built on their solid 14th place the previous season to finish 8th, qualifying for the Intertoto Cup group stage.

Kit
1860 Munich's kit was manufactured by Nike and sponsored by Munich brewery Löwenbräu.

Players

First team squad
Squad at end of season

Left club during season

Competitions

Legend

Bundesliga

League table

References

TSV 1860 Munich seasons
TSV 1860 Munchen